Maria Adísia Barros de Sá (born 7 November 1929, in Cariré) is a Brazilian radio host, television presenter, writer, and journalist. In 2009, the newspaper O Estado de S. Paulo established the Adísia Sá Journalism Cultural Contest in her honour. In 2013, she was awarded the Medal of Abolition by the state of Ceará.

References 

1929 births
Living people
Brazilian television presenters
Brazilian writers
Brazilian journalists